Slovenski glasnik (English: The Slovene Herald) was a Slovene-language magazine published monthly from 1858 till 1869.

History and profile
Slovenski glasnik was established by Slovenian Corinthian Anton Janežič. The magazine was edited by Janežič and published in Klagenfurt, then in the Duchy of Carinthia (now in Austria). Among the contributors were the most important Slovene writers of the period, namely Simon Jenko, Josip Jurčič, Fran Erjavec, Valentin Mandelc and Fran Levstik.

Slovenski glasnik was the first Slovene language magazine with a chess column. It was edited by Josip Ogrinec and Ivan Kos, and for the first time in history presented chess terminology and chess problems in Slovene.

See also
 List of magazines in Slovenia

References

1858 establishments in the Austrian Empire
Magazines established in 1858
Magazines disestablished in 1869
Slovene-language magazines
Defunct magazines published in Austria
Defunct magazines published in Slovenia
Monthly magazines
Mass media in Klagenfurt